Thurston is an English-language name. The name has several origins. In some cases it can have originated from the Old Norse personal name Þórsteinn. This name is derived from the Old Norse elements Þórr ("Thor", the Scandinavian thunder god) and steinn ("stone", "rock"). In other cases the name can have originated from the name of Thurston, located in Suffolk, England. This place name is derived from the Old Norse personal name Þóri and the Old English element tūn ("enclosure", "settlement").

Surname

People
Asa Thurston (1787–1868), American missionary in Hawaii
Baratunde Thurston (born 1977), American comedian
Colin Thurston (1947–2007), English recording engineer and producer
Darren Thurston (born c. 1970), Canadian animal rights activist
David Thurston (1918–2013), American aircraft designer
Deborah Thurston, American engineer
E. Temple Thurston (1879–1933), Irish author
Fred Thurston (1933–2014), American football player
Howard Thurston (1869–1936), American magician
Jennifer L. Thurston (born 1967), American judge
John Thurston (basketball) (born 1948), American college basketball coach
John Thurston (inventor) (1777–1850), dubbed "the father of the billiards trade"
John Thurston (politician) (born 1972), American politician from Arkansas
Johnathan Thurston (born 1983), Australian rugby league footballer
John Mellen Thurston (1847–1916), American politician
John Bates Thurston (1836–1897), British governor of Fiji
Katherine Thurston (1875–1911), Irish author
Laura M. Hawley Thurston (1812–1842), American poet, educator
Lorrin A. Thurston (1857–1931), American lawyer and leader of the 1893 Hawaiian revolution
Lucy Goodale Thurston (1795–1876), Hawaiian missionary and author, wife of Asa Thurston
Robert Thurston (born 1936), American science fiction writer
Robert Henry Thurston (1839–1903), American engineer
Samuel Thurston (1815–1851), American politician
Scott Thurston (born 1952), American musician
Sloppy Thurston (1899-1973), American professional baseball pitcher
William Thurston (1946–2012), American mathematician

Fictional characters
Renton Thurston, protagonist of Eureka Seven
Sid "The Snitch" Thurston, character played by Peter Jurasik on Hill Street Blues and its spin-off, Beverly Hills Buntz
Francis Wayland Thurston, narrator of The Call of Cthulhu
King Thurston in the medieval romance King Horn

Given name

People
Thurston Clarke (born 1946), American historian, author and journalist
Thurston Daniels (1859–1926), Populist politician from the U.S. state of Washington
Thurston Dart (1921–71), British musicologist, conductor, and keyboard player
Thurston Hall (1882–1958), American film actor
Thurston Harris (1931–90), American singer
Thurston Howe (born 1983), lead guitarist of the heavy metal band Flayed Disciple
Thurston Hunt (executed 1601), English Roman Catholic priest
Thurston Moore (born 1958), American musician in the rock band Sonic Youth
Thurston Rostron (1863–91), English footballer 
Thurston Twigg-Smith (born 1921), businessman and philanthropist from Hawaii

Fictional characters
Thurston Howell III, one of the seven castaways, credited as "The Millionaire," portrayed by actor Jim Backus in the 1960s sitcom Gilligan's Island

A Zebra in the Disney Junior Series The Lion Guard. Thurston's catchphrase is "Panic and run."

See also
Thurston (disambiguation)
Thorstein
Thurstan
Louis Leon Thurstone (1887–1955), American pioneer in psychometrics and psychophysics

References